The Astongate scandal was a greenwashing campaign in 2020 which involved a number of well-known brands spreading misinformation about electric vehicles in the wake of the UK's declaration to end the sale of combustion engine vehicles from 2030.

The term Astongate was assigned, given the relation of the misinformation campaign to Aston Martin, one of the companies which commissioned the greenwashing report.

Background

The greenwashing scandal has its roots in November 2020, when a press release was issued to British news media detailing a purported study that claimed that the manufacturer of electric vehicles was so -intense that EVs had to be driven nearly  before they offset the energy required for their production.

While this claim about the energy required to produce an electric vehicle had been previously debunked, the press release issued by Clarendon Communications claimed that this was based on “groundbreaking” new research which had been commissioned by Aston Martin, Bosch, Honda, McLaren and the Renewable Transport Fuel Association.

The story was reported by a number of high-profile publications including The Daily Telegraph, The Sunday Times, and the Metro., as well as specialist industry titles such as IrishEVs and InsideEVs.

However, within a matter of days this was revealed to be disinformation promoted in the media in the wake of UK Prime Minister Boris Johnson’s announcement that the sale of new fossil fuel vehicles would be banned from 2030 – which had been announced on 18 November 2020.

The Report

Based on the comparison of these two cars, the study promoted by Clarendon Communications claimed that all electric vehicles would need to drive 50,000 miles (77,000 km) in order to offset the emissions from manufacture.

The study included a foreword from Matt Western, the Member of Parliament (MP) for Gaydon, the borough in which Aston Martin's headquarters is situated.

Highlighting Discrepancies

While the initial press release garnered unquestioned coverage in a number of publications, Michael Liebreich, founder of BloombergNEF, began to investigate the claims alongside Auke Hoekstra – Senior Advisor on Electric Mobility at Eindhoven University of Technology, who had previously published academic papers on the emissions of battery electric vehicles.

They found that the Astongate study had underestimated the emissions from combustion engine vehicles by as much as 50%, using data that preceded the Dieselgate scandal, where automotive manufacturers were found to be concealing the real-world  and  emissions of their vehicles by cheating in laboratory tests.
Hoekstra demonstrated that, taking into account a wider range of both electric and combustion engine vehicles, that a typical EV need only drive 16,000-18,000 miles (25,700-30,000 km) in order to offset the emissions from manufacture.

Clarendon Communications

In the wake of Hoekstra debunking the data presented by Clarendon Communications on behalf of the corporations that commissioned the study, Liebreich began investigating the PR agency itself in order to understand the motivations behind the report.

Having found that Clarendon Communications did not list any team members on its website, but did list Bosch and Aston Martin amongst its clients, Liebreich contacted UK Companies House to find the names of the directors of the business.

He found that a single director was listed, Rebecca Caroline Stephens, and that the business had been launched in early 2020. 
Further investigation of Land Registry demonstrated that the address at which Clarendon Communications was registered was owned by Rebecca Caroline Stephens and her husband James Michael Stephens – the Director Global Government & Corporate Affairs at Aston Martin Lagonda Ltd.

As such, it was evident that Clarendon Communications had been set up as a puppet company by James Michael Stephens and registered in the name of his wife, a nurse, in order to promote the disinformation report. Rebecca Stephens subsequently confirmed to The Guardian that the report attributed to Clarendon Communications had been compiled by the companies who had commissioned the report.

Response

In the days that followed the exposure of the relationship between Aston Martin and the puppet PR agency, the website and social media channels for Clarendon Communications were shut down.

In response to the revelations about Clarendon Communications, Francis Ingham, Director General of the Public Relations and Communications Association, commented: “We have a duty to fight misinformation, not purvey it. PR agencies should be fully transparent about who they represent. Failure to disclose client relationships damages trust in our industry and lends credence to misleading perceptions of PR as a sinister practice”.

Matt Western MP, who had provided the foreword to the report, later claimed that he was not aware of the link between Clarendon Communications and Aston Martin.

References 

Greenwashing
Aston Martin
Electric vehicle industry
2020 in the United Kingdom